DXNV (107.9 FM) was a radio station owned by Progressive Broadcasting Corporation and operated by ZimZam Management. It formerly served as a relay station of NU 107/Win Radio from 1992 to December 31, 2013, when it went off the air.

References

Progressive Broadcasting Corporation
Radio stations in General Santos
Radio stations established in 1992
Radio stations disestablished in 2013
Defunct radio stations in the Philippines